Demirköprü (also known as Jisr al-Hadid) is a village in the Antakya District of Hatay Province, Turkey. The population of Demirköprü was 1,076 as of 2012. The village was the birthplace of Yusuf al-Sa'dun, a commander in the Hananu Revolt.

Demirköprü is the location of the ancient settlement of Gephyra (= bridge in Greek), an important station for the transport of goods from the port of Seleucia Pieria to Antioch and further east to Euphrates.

References

Villages in Hatay Province
Antakya District